The Artist's Wife and His Setter Dog is an 1884–1889 painting by Thomas Eakins. It is part of the collection of the Metropolitan Museum of Art.

References

1880s paintings
Paintings in the collection of the Metropolitan Museum of Art
Artist's Wife
Dogs in art